Noble County is a county in the U.S. state of Indiana. As of the 2020 United States Census, the population was 47,457. The county seat is Albion. The county is divided into 13 townships which provide local services.

Noble County comprises the Kendallville, IN Micropolitan Statistical Area and is included in the Fort Wayne-Huntington-Auburn, IN Combined Statistical Area.

History
Noble County's government was organized beginning in 1836. The county was named for a family that was influential in Indiana politics at the time, including the Indiana governor at the time (1831-1837) Noah Noble and his brother, James, who served as the state's first senator after it gained statehood.

Noble County's first homesteaders came from New England, known as "Yankees"; people descended from the English Puritans who settled New England in the 1600s. They were part of a wave of New Englanders who migrated west to what was then the Northwest Territory during the early 1800s. This migration was sparked as a result of the completion of the Erie Canal and conclusion of the Black Hawk War. They founded the towns of Kendallville and Albion.

Geography
Noble County is in the state's northeast corner. Its low, rolling terrain is dotted with lakes and wetlands, but is otherwise entirely devoted to agriculture or urban development. Its highest point ( ASL), Sand Hill in Wayne Township, near the county's north line with LaGrange County, is the state's second-highest named point. The Elkhart River flows from the NW part of the county into Elkhart County.

Adjacent counties

 LaGrange County - north
 Steuben County - northeast
 DeKalb County - east
 Allen County - southeast
 Whitley County - south
 Kosciusko County - southwest
 Elkhart County - northwest

Cities
 Kendallville
 Ligonier

Towns

 Albion
 Avilla
 Cromwell
 Rome City
 Wolcottville

Unincorporated communities

 Ari
 Bakertown
 Bear Lake
 Brimfield
 Burr Oak
 Cosperville
 Ege
 Green Center
 Grismore
 Indian Village
 Kimmell (census-designated place)
 LaOtto
 Lisbon
 Merriam
 Ormas
 Port Mitchell
 Swan
 Wakeville Village
 Washington Center
 Wawaka
 Wayne Center
 Wilmot
 Wolf Lake

Townships

 Albion
 Allen
 Elkhart
 Green
 Jefferson
 Noble
 Orange
 Perry
 Sparta
 Swan
 Washington
 Wayne
 York

Major highways

  U.S. Route 6
  U.S. Route 33
  Indiana State Road 3
  Indiana State Road 5
  Indiana State Road 8
  Indiana State Road 9
  Indiana State Road 109
  Indiana State Road 205

Major lakes

 Axel Lake
 Bartley Lake
 Big Lake
 Bixler Lake
 Bristol Lake
 Cree Lake
 Crooked Lake (part)
 Diamond Lake
 Eagle Lake
 Engle Lake
 Gordy Lake
 Grannis Lake
 Jones Lake
 Knapp Lake
 Latta Lake
 Lindsey Lake
 Little Long Lake
 Loon Lake (part)
 Lower Long Lake
 Marl Lake
 Millers Lake
 Moore Lake
 Moss Lake
 Mud
 Pleasant Lake
 Port Mitchell Lake
 Roudy Lake
 Round Lake
 Schockopee Lake
 Skinner Lake
 Sparta Lake
 Summit Lake
 Sylvan Lake
 Upper Long Lake
 Waldron Lake
 West Lakes
 Wible Lake

Protected areas

 Chain O'Lakes State Park
 Eagle Lake Wetland Conservation Area
 Hammer Wetland Nature Preserve
 Mallard Roost Wetland Conservation Area
 Mendenhall Wetland Conservation Area
 Pioneer Trails Camp
 Rome City Wetland Conservation Area
 West Lakes Conservation Inc Tract

Climate and weather

Government

The county government is a constitutional body granted specific powers by the Constitution of Indiana and the Indiana Code. The county council is the legislative branch of the county government, controlling spending and revenue collection. Representatives are elected to four-year terms from county districts. The council members are responsible for setting salaries, the annual budget and special spending. The council has limited authority to impose local taxes, in the form of an income and property tax that is subject to state level approval, excise taxes and service taxes.

The executive body of the county is the board of commissioners. The commissioners are elected county-wide to staggered four-year terms. One commissioner serves as president. The commissioners execute the acts legislated by the council, collect revenue and manage the county government.

The county maintains a small claims court that handles civil cases. The judge on the court is elected to a term of four years and must be a member of the Indiana Bar Association. The judge is assisted by a constable who is elected to a four-year term. In some cases, court decisions can be appealed to the state level circuit court.

The county has other elected offices, including sheriff, coroner, auditor, treasurer, recorder, surveyor and circuit court clerk. Each officer serves a term of four years and oversees a different part of county government. Members elected to county government positions are required to declare party affiliations and be residents of the county.

Each township has a trustee who administers rural fire protection and ambulance service, provides poor relief and manages cemetery care, among other duties. The trustee is assisted in these duties by a three-member township board. The trustees and board members are elected to four-year terms.

Noble County is part of Indiana's 3rd congressional district and is represented by Jim Banks in the United States Congress. It is part of Indiana Senate district 13 and Indiana House of Representatives district 82.

Demographics

As of the 2010 United States Census, there were 47,536 people, 17,355 households, and 12,591 families in the county. The racial makeup of the county was 92.5% white, 0.4% black or African American, 0.4% Asian, 0.2% American Indian, 5.2% from other races, and 1.3% from two or more races. Those of Hispanic or Latino origin made up 9.6% of the population. In terms of ancestry, 32.2% claimed German, 11.1% claimed American, 9.8% claimed Irish, and 8.5% claimed English.

Of the 17,355 households, 35.9% had children under the age of 18 living with them, 57.2% were married couples living together, 10.0% had a female householder with no husband present, 27.5% were non-families, and 22.9% of all households were made up of individuals. The average household size was 2.69 and the average family size was 3.16. The median age was 37.1 years.

The median income for a household in the county was $47,697 and the median income for a family was $53,959. Males had a median income of $40,335 versus $29,887 for females. The per capita income for the county was $19,783. About 7.6% of families and 11.4% of the population were below the poverty line, including 16.4% of those under age 18 and 6.5% of those age 65 or over.

Education

School districts

 Central Noble Community School Corporation
 East Noble School Corporation
 Smith-Green Community Schools
 West Noble School Corporation

See also
 National Register of Historic Places listings in Noble County, Indiana
 The News Sun, daily newspaper covering Noble County

References

External links
 Noble County government website

 
Indiana counties
1836 establishments in Indiana
Populated places established in 1836
Fort Wayne, IN Metropolitan Statistical Area